Henry Bayntun (1621–1672) was an English politician who sat in the House of Commons between 1661 and 1672.

Bayntun was the son of Sir Edward Bayntun of Bromham, Wiltshire and his first wife  Elizabeth Maynard, daughter of Sir Henry Maynard of Eaton, Essex. and was baptised on 14 November 1621. He matriculated at St John's College, Oxford  on 7 December 1638, aged 14. He travelled abroad from 1640 to 1643 and was a captain of horse in the Royalist army from 1643 to 1644.

In 1661, Bayntun was elected Member of Parliament for Chippenham for the Cavalier Parliament in a double return. He was allowed to sit on the merits of the return until the election was declared void a month later. He was then re-elected as MP for Chippenham.   
 
Bayntun died at the age of about 50 and was buried at Bromham on 10 November 1672.

Bayntun married  Joanna Trimnell daughter of Edmund Trimnell, yeoman, of Hanger, Bremhill, Wiltshire by 1653. They had a son Edward and two daughters and she died in 1675. Bayntun was the brother of  Edward Bayntun and half-brother of Nicholas Bayntun.

References

1621 births
1672 deaths
English MPs 1661–1679
Alumni of St John's College, Oxford
Cavaliers